Christopher Plummer (1929–2021) was a Canadian actor.

Christopher Plummer can also refer to:

Christopher Plummer (priest) (fl. 1490s–1530s), Canon of Windsor
Chris Plummer (born 1976), English association footballer
Chris Plummer (film editor), New Zealand film editor